A chemical substance is a material with a specific chemical composition. In everyday language, only synthetic chemicals might be understood as chemicals.

Chemical may also refer to:

 Chemical industry
 Chemical element
 Chemical warfare
 Drug, any substance that, when absorbed into the body of a living organism, alters normal bodily function
 Chemistry, relating to the science of matter and the changes it undergoes

In music

Albums
 Chemicals (Smile Empty Soul album), 2013

EPs
 Chemicals (EP), a 2012 EP by Love and Death

Songs
 "Chemical" (Crashdïet song), 2010
 "Chemical" (Joseph Arthur song), 2000
"Chemical" (MK song), 2021
 "Chemicals" (Love and Death song), 2013
 "Chemicals" (Tiësto and Don Diablo song), 2015 
 "Chemicals" (Dean Lewis song), 2018
 "Chemical", by New Order from Republic, 1993
 "Chemical", by No One from No One, 2001
 "Chemicals", by Peking Duk featuring Sarah Aarons, 2021
 "Chemicals", by Scars on Broadway from Scars on Broadway, 2008
 "Chemicals", by the Vamps from Cherry Blossom, 2020